Tachypleus gigas, commonly known as the Indo-Pacific horseshoe crab, Indonesian horseshoe crab, Indian horseshoe crab, or southern horseshoe crab, is one of the four extant (living) species of horseshoe crab.

Description 

Tachypleus gigas has a sage-green chitinous exoskeleton. Like other horseshoe crabs, the carapace of T. gigas consists of a larger frontal one (the prosoma) and a smaller, spine-edged rear one (the opisthosoma). There are six pairs of prosomal appendages/legs, consisting of a small frontal pair in front of the mouth and five larger walking/pushing legs on either side of the mouth. The book gills are located on the underside of the opisthosoma. They have a long spiny tail known as the telson. The tail bears a crest dorsally and is concave ventrally, giving it an essentially triangular cross section.

Despite the scientific name T. gigas, the close relative Tachypleus tridentatus reaches a larger size. Both are considerably larger than Carcinoscorpius rotundicauda.
The carapace which shields the prosoma also bears two pairs of eyes – a pair of simple eyes at the front, and a pair of compound eyes positioned laterally. In common with other horseshoe crabs, T. gigas also has ventral eyes near the mouthparts, and photoreceptors in the caudal spine.

Sexual difference 
Like the other species, females of T. gigas grow larger than males. There are some geographic variations in the average size, but most are similar to, or somewhat smaller, than the ones from Sarawak.

In addition to their smaller size, males have a paler and rougher carapace, act as hosts to a greater number of epibionts, have six (instead of three) long spines on either side of the rear carapace, and their two front pairs of walking legs, prosomal appendages two and three, have hooks (they are scissor-like in females). Juveniles (both sexes) also have six long spines on either side of the rear carapace, similar to adult males.

Distribution and habitat 

Tachypleus gigas is one of three living species of horseshoe crabs in Asia, the others being Tachypleus tridentatus and Carcinoscorpius rotundicauda. The fourth living species, Limulus polyphemus, is found in the Americas. T. gigas is found in tropical South and Southeast Asia, ranging from the Bay of Bengal to the South China Sea, with records from India, Malaysia, Singapore, Indonesia, Thailand, Vietnam and the Philippines. Although records are lacking, it likely also occurs in Myanmar.

It occurs in both marine and brackish waters in salinities down to 15 PSU, but their eggs only hatch above 20 PSU.

Behavior, ecology and conservation
The lifecycle of T. gigas is relatively long and involves a large number of instars. Males are thought to pass through 12 moults before reaching sexual maturity, while females pass through 13 moults.

The diet of T. gigas is chiefly composed of molluscs, detritus, and polychaetes, which it seeks on the ocean floor. House crows have been observed to turn T. gigas over and eat the soft underside, while gulls only attack individuals that are already stranded upside-down.

Since horseshoe crabs do not moult after they have reached sexual maturity, they are often colonised by epibionts. The dominant diatoms are species of the genera Navicula, Nitzschia, and Skeletonema. Among the larger organisms, the sea anemone Metridium, the bryozoan Membranipora, the barnacle Balanus amphitrite, and the bivalves Anomia and Crassostrea are the most frequent colonists of T. gigas. Rarer epibionts include green algae, flatworms, tunicates, isopods, amphipods, gastropods, mussels, pelecypods, annelids, and polychaetes.

Tachypleus gigas is listed as Data Deficient on the IUCN Red List.

Taxonomy 
Tachypleus gigas was first described by Otto Friedrich Müller in 1785. It was originally placed in the genus Limulus, but was transferred to the genus Tachypleus by Reginald Innes Pocock in 1902.

Tachypleus gigas is estimated to have diverged from the other Asian species of horseshoe crab . While it is clear that the American horseshoe crab Limulus polyphemus is distinct from the remaining extant species of horseshoe crab, relationships within the Asian horseshoe crabs remains uncertain. T. gigas has a chromosome number of 2n = 28, compared to 26 in T. tridentatus, 32 in Carcinoscorpius, and 52 in Limulus.

References 

Xiphosura
Animals described in 1785